Ilir Gjoni (born 20 April 1962) is an Albanian politician. He served as the Minister of Defence of Albania from 7 July 2000 to 8 November 2000, and Minister of Internal Affairs from 8 November 2000 to 22 February 2002. He was appointed interior minister following the dismissal of Spartak Poçi and general reshuffle of the Cabinet. Gjoni oversaw an increase in the defensive readiness of Albania on its border with Montenegro following the 13 April 1999 Albania–Yugoslav border incident.

On 7 September 2000, Gjoni signed a memorandum of agreement with the governments of the United States of America, Germany, and Norway, wherein the government of Albania promised to destroy over 130,000 weapons it had collected from the civilian population of the country, as well as surplus military weapons in an effort to disarm post-conflict countries, reduce tensions in the Balkans and reduce illicit small arms trade.  U.S. Assistant Secretary of State for Political-Military Affairs Eric D. Newsom was present for this signing.

By 2010, Gjoni served as vice-chairman of the Parliament of Albania and as a member of Albania's National Security Committee.

Succeeding Mehmet Elezi, he is Albanian ambassador to Switzerland in Bern since 2013.

Personal life
He is the son of Xhelil Gjoni, a former secretary of the Central Committee of the Communist Party of Albania. Xhelil Gjoni was reported to have close ties to Sali Berisha, the former president of Albania, former prime minister and leader of the main opposition Democratic Party.

References 

Year of birth uncertain
Living people
21st-century Albanian politicians
Government ministers of Albania
Defence ministers of Albania
Interior ministers of Albania
1962 births
Ambassadors of Albania